Kovil Nunatak (‘Kovilski Nunatak’ \'ko-vil-ski 'nu-na-tak\) is the rock-tipped hill of elevation 2041 m projecting from the ice cap west of north-central Sentinel Range in Ellsworth Mountains, Antarctica.  It is named after the settlement of Kovil in Southern Bulgaria.

Location
US mapping in 1961.

Maps
 Newcomer Glacier.  Scale 1:250 000 topographic map.  Reston, Virginia: US Geological Survey, 1961.
 Antarctic Digital Database (ADD). Scale 1:250000 topographic map of Antarctica. Scientific Committee on Antarctic Research (SCAR). Since 1993, regularly updated.

Notes

References
 Kovil Nunatak. SCAR Composite Gazetteer of Antarctica.
 Bulgarian Antarctic Gazetteer. Antarctic Place-names Commission. (details in Bulgarian, basic data in English)

External links
 Kovil Nunatak. Copernix satellite image

Ellsworth Mountains
Bulgaria and the Antarctic
Nunataks of Ellsworth Land